Yeongdo District is a gu in Busan, South Korea. The gu itself is limited to Yeong-do (Yeong Island) located on the south edge of central Busan. It attained the status of gu in 1957.

The Korea Maritime and Ocean University and the National Maritime Museum of Korea are located in Yeongdo-gu.

Origin of the Name "Yeongdo"
The former name of Yeong-do (Yeong Island) was Jeolyeong-do (Jeolyeong Island).

Mythologically, horses that could run a thousand miles, so-called "Chollima", lived on this island. Because the horses living on this island could run so fast that their shadows could not follow them, this island was called, "Jeolyeong-do".

After the South Korea government arranged their administrative divisions' names, the name of the island was changed to, "Yeongdo-gu.

Administrative divisions

Yeongdo-gu is divided into 22 legal dong, which all together comprise 11 administrative dong, as follows:

Sister cities
 Luwan, China
 Marikina, Philippines

Cityscape

See also
Geography of South Korea
Subdivisions of South Korea

References

External links

 Yeongdo-gu website 

 
Districts of Busan